Harry Manfredini (born August 25, 1943 in Chicago, Illinois) is an American composer and jazz soloist, who has scored more than one hundred films, including most of the Friday the 13th series. He has had years of classical training, as well as twenty years in the popular music scene. In conversation with Russian journalist and composer Tony Vilgotsky, Harry Manfredini said that his musical tastes and style were influenced by such composers as Giacomo Puccini, Igor Stravinsky, Maurice Ravel and others.

Filmography 
 Through the Looking Glass (1976)
 Here Come the Tigers (1978)
 Manny's Orphans (1978)
 Night Flowers (1979)
 Danny (1977)
 Friday the 13th (1980)
 The Children (1980)
 Friday the 13th Part 2 (1981)
 Swamp Thing (1982)
 Friday the 13th Part III (1982)
 Spring Break (1983)
 Friday the 13th: The Final Chapter (1984)
 The Hills Have Eyes Part II (1985)
 Friday the 13th: A New Beginning (1985)
 House (1985)
 Friday the 13th Part VI: Jason Lives (1986)
 Slaughter High (1986)
 House II: The Second Story (1987)
 Friday the 13th Part VII: The New Blood (1988)
 Cameron's Closet (1988)
 DeepStar Six (1989)
 The Horror Show (1989)
 House IV (1992)
 Jason Goes to Hell: The Final Friday (1993)
 Amore! (1993)
 Wishmaster (1997)
 The Omega Code (1999)
 Jason X (2001)
 Wolves of Wall Street (2002)
 The Anna Nicole Smith Story (2007)
 House of Usher (2008)
 Mrs. Washington Goes to Smith (2009)
 Snow White: A Deadly Summer (2012)
 A Talking Cat!?! (2013)
 Lake Eerie (2016)
 Friday the 13th: The Game (2017)
 A Chance In The World (2018)

References

External links 
 
 

1943 births
American film score composers
American jazz composers
American male jazz composers
American people of Italian descent
Gramavision Records artists
Jazz musicians from Illinois
Living people
American male film score composers
Musicians from Chicago
Varèse Sarabande Records artists
Video game composers